Orchid is a town in Indian River County, Florida, United States. The population was 415 at the 2010 census and was the ninth highest-income place in the United States. It is ranked sixth in Florida locations by per capita income. Orchid is part of the Sebastian–Vero Beach Metropolitan Statistical Area.

Most of the town is actually a gated community called Orchid Island Golf and Beach Club. East of SR A1A, there is a beach front condominium complex. The rest of Orchid is uninhabited islands. Some of the islands are Plug Island, Preachers Island, and Horseshoe Island. North of Horseshoe Island is Pelican Island, the first National Wildlife Refuge in the United States. Running along the town limits (mostly) is the historic, unpaved Jungle Trail.

Geography

Demographics

As of the census of 2000, there were 140 people, 69 households, and 64 families residing in the town. The racial makeup of the town was 100.00% White. Hispanic or Latino of any race were 0.71% of the population.

There were 69 households, out of which 7.2% had children under the age of 18 living with them, 92.8% were married couples living together, and 7.2% were non-families. 7.2% of all households were made up of individuals, and none had someone living alone who was 65 years of age or older. The average household size was 2.03 and the average family size was 2.11.

In the town, the population was spread out, with 4.3% under the age of 18, 0.7% from 18 to 24, 4.3% from 25 to 44, 58.6% from 45 to 64, and 32.1% who were 65 years of age or older. The median age was 61 years. For every 100 females, there were 100.0 males. For every 100 females age 18 and over, there were 97.1 males.

The median income for a household in the town was in excess of $200,000, as is the median income for a family. Males had a median income of over $100,000 versus $36,250 for females. The per capita income for the town was $135,870. None of the population is below the poverty line.

Notable attractions
Disney's Vero Beach Resort, a part of the Disney Vacation resorts, is located in the area.

The Environmental Learning Center is located in the Orchid/Wabasso area

References

Towns in Indian River County, Florida
Beaches of Florida
Towns in Florida
Populated coastal places in Florida on the Atlantic Ocean
Beaches of Indian River County, Florida
1957 establishments in Florida
Populated places established in 1957